The Citizens Foundation (TCF) is a non-profit organization, and one of the largest privately owned networks of low-cost formal schools in Pakistan. The foundation operates a network of 1,833 school units, educating 280,000 students through over 13,000 teachers and principals, and over 17,400 employees. Approximately 94% of the foundation's expenditure is allocated to the Education program. In addition, TCF also conducts a literacy and numeracy skill development programme in communities linked to its schools which has taught reading and writing to over 160,000 adults.

Introduction 
The Citizens Foundation (TCF) was established in August 1995. It is a professionally managed charitable organization that builds and runs schools, providing primary and secondary education to boys and girls in rural areas and urban slums of Pakistan. As of March 2022, TCF has expanded its network to 1,833 operational school units, which provide education to 280,000 students. The Economist has called The Citizens Foundation (TCF) "perhaps the largest network of independently run schools in the world." The foundation is the largest private employer of women in Pakistan with an all-female faculty of 12,000 teachers and principals. 90% of TCF alumni pursue intermediate education, while 45% go on to complete tertiary education; 71% above the age of 22 are employed.

TCF maintains a balanced gender ratio; close to 50% of students are female. In order to achieve this goal, TCF exclusively hires female teachers to make parents comfortable with the idea of sending their girls to schools. Each school hires support staff from within the community, who also help convince parents to send their children to school, especially girls.

Origin 
Out of the population of 164,741,924 only 82,206,220 people are educated in Pakistan and 24% of the population are below the poverty line.

Like other developing countries of the world Pakistan also faces the issues of population explosion, poverty, unemployment, income disparity and low literacy rate. In 1995, six successful top-level managers of Pakistan attempted to find a way to solve these problems, and the root cause identified by them was education. Within a few months The Citizens Foundation (TCF) was formed in Karachi.

Pakistan has the second highest number of out-of-school children in the world, after Nigeria, and it is the world's sixth largest country. To tackle this challenge, the founders of TCF wanted to leverage their experience building companies to build a network of 1,000 schools for the country's poorest, out-of-school children. The group put their own money into a pilot to build 5 schools in Karachi's worst slums that did not have electricity, sanitation, and clean water. With $30 million supporting 252,000 students today, TCF spends less than $12 (€10) per child per month. Less than 10% is spent on administration (curriculum, testing, staff engineers, etc.).

TCF model 
TCF has evolved a model to deliver quality education in Pakistan's most neglected rural and slum communities where we find children, especially girls, out of school. It is built around the following key elements:

 Educating the poorest of the poor by keeping fees affordable. TCF does not offer its education free of cost. As a policy, school fees are adjusted so that they are not more than 5 - 7% of a family's income. Fees for a family is decided on two factors: Monthly income of the family and number of school going children.
 Establishing purpose-built schools located in the heart of communities. The school building is the heart of TCF's human-centered design. Children in Pakistan walk to school so schools are built in the heart of communities in order to maximize enrollment, especially for girls. TCF builds where there are no other schooling options. The architecture is visually attractive – to inspire children and parents – and pragmatic. Schools are designed to maximize natural light and ventilation, since the areas where TCF works often do not have electricity.
 Ensuring a min. 50% female ratio in the student body with the help of an all-female faculty. TCF hires only female teachers so that parents will send girls to school. Hiring only women transforms gender dynamics in conservative communities. TCF transports teachers to school, which helps attract and retain the most qualified women from immediate and neighboring communities.
 Maintaining a high quality of education and a focus on personality development. To ensure quality, TCF trains teachers, principals, and area managers extensively. Teacher training is focused on content knowledge (their own understanding of the subjects they teach) rather than pedagogy. It consists of 120 hours in total per teacher per year. Our Principals’ Academy emphasizes leadership and management skills. We also train our field-level area education managers who typically oversee 30 to 40 schools each.
 Continuing guidance and financial support to alumni beyond matriculation. TCF offers lifelong support to students. Mentoring and career counseling are provided to all students during secondary school. TCF also helps graduates transition to university by counseling them through the application process and ensuring that they secure scholarships. In 2016, TCF started its first college in Karachi for grades 11 and 12.
 Developing programs to develop and support the community beyond the core education program. TCF has a number of community development programs in order to magnify its impact beyond the core program and to serve communities around our school areas.
 Building a highly capable organization with professional management. TCF also ensures quality measurement to maintain accountability and integrity internally and for donors. Performance data like enrollment numbers and gender ratio on every school every month is collected. Students are tested externally and internally; teachers are tested on content knowledge of the subjects they teach. The Principals’ Quality Index scores principals for their leadership skills and achievements.

Whereas most low-cost private schools in Pakistan use English textbooks – a language that teachers and children don't speak – our curriculum is in Urdu and we teach English as a second language. We develop our own textbooks and teachers’ guides drawing from the best materials available internationally but relevant to the exposure of an underprivileged child in Pakistan. Our curriculum is built on 5 Cs: Creativity, Critical Thinking, Conceptual Understanding, Confidence, and Communication.

Education program 
The Citizens Foundation provides primary and secondary level education, through which they are trying to bring about a qualitative and quantitative change in the education sector of Pakistan. The students at TCF schools are charged a nominal fee, out of which up to 95% scholarship is awarded along with uniforms and books on a pay-as-you-can-afford basis. This is judged on the basis of the overall household income of each family, its circumstances and education related expenses. Applicants for financial assistance provide necessary details about their family income and resources by completing a scholarship form. TCF school staff, through visits to the applicants' homes, verify this information. School principals then send completed scholarship forms, along with their recommendations to the Regional Office where the final decision is taken. Scholarships are given for one academic year and the recipients are eligible to reapply. Students who are eligible get uniforms and textbooks free of cost.

Infrastructure 
TCF operates a network of 722 vans that provide transportation to its faculty in order to facilitate quality staffing in remote areas. Schools are located across Pakistan.

Teacher training 
In order to provide quality education to the students a Teacher Training Center was made in 1997, in Karachi. Every new teacher hired goes through four-weeks of extensive pre-service training before being permitted to teach at a TCF school. The training center closely evaluate the teachers during the year and provide training sessions from time to time as per requirement of the curriculum. The program components are

 Pre-Service Training: Prepares the new hires before they are placed in schools.
 In-Service Training: Ensures continual professional learning and quality teaching.
 Principal's Academy: Helps guide the Principals to become effective school leaders.
 Training of Trainers: Executed through Master Trainers helps to develop new trainers within the TCF school network.

Quality assurance 
TCF has a dedicated Quality Assurance (QA) team to oversee the quality of the Education Programme with the objective of maintaining an education standard in all the TCF School units. Visits are conducted throughout the year to monitor each school's educational activities, formal classroom observations are carried out and insights are collected from Principals, teachers and students to come up with a focused and dedicated school improvement plan. The QA team also conducts centralized examinations.

Community development 
In addition to the Education program, TCF also operates some community development programmes through the school premises.

Aagahi adult literacy programme 
Aagahi, TCF's adult literacy programme was launched in 2005 as a community development initiative and teaches literacy skills such as reading, writing, and basic math to women from rural areas and urban slums in areas around TCF Schools. In 2017, Aagahi was awarded the UNESCO Confucius Prize for Literacy. In Urdu, the word Aagahi stands for "awareness".

Vocational training 
Training Centers are established inside TCF school premises where trained teachers impart 6-month specialized training in two specific trades which includes Beauty-Cosmetology and Cutting-Sewing-Embroidery. Participants are taught skills to launch their own small businesses, with the objective of supporting families to lift themselves out of poverty and facilitate sustainable community impact.

Water filtration 
In communities where access to clean water is an issue, TCF opens community-scale filtered water depots. One outlet provides clean water to the children attending school while the other is used by the community around the school.

Government Schools Programme 
In 2016, TCF's Strategic Development Unit (SDU) initiated the Government Schools Program, under which TCF took over operations at 274 adopted government schools. 256 of these schools are in Punjab, 8 in Sindh and 5 in KPK and 5 in Baluchistan. As a result of work on improving conditions at these schools, student enrollment increased from an average of 47 to 101 students per school. In 2017, students from TCF-operated government schools received an average of 72.6% marks in the 5th grade board exam.

Earthquake relief operations 
On October 8, 2005, Pakistan witnessed one of the worst natural disasters in its history, the earthquake in Azad Jammu and Kashmir and areas of NWFP. TCF provided earthquake victims with food, blankets and tents. Medical camps were set with adequate operation theatres. Rehabilitation process was started in which first 6,300 shelters were built to help over 60,000 victims survive the harsh winters. Then a layout was made to make permanent houses and Earthquake Rehabilitation and Reconstruction Authority (ERRA) approved the design of the house.

TCF also developed a water supply scheme in most villages to provide easy access to water for the people. Previously many people had to walk to the neighboring village to get water in buckets or pots. In the earthquake-affected areas the whole infrastructure was destroyed, many schools collapsed killing thousands of teachers and children. 21 schools will be built by TCF to help affected children.

COVID-19 Response Appeal 
In the wake of lockdowns due to the COVID-19 pandemic, TCF began a fund whereby 20% of Sadqah, Zakat, or general donations were allocated to providing cash-based relief to families struggling communities around its schools across Pakistan. The fund was also used to provide donations of PPE to frontline healthcare professionals. TCF alumni and teachers played a role in identifying families who were most affected by lockdowns.

Distance Learning and Support Programme 
To ensure continuity of learning for millions of children who were forced to stay out of school due to lockdowns, TCF developed a TV-based edutainment programme named "Ilm Ka Aangan" (The Learning Courtyard), in collaboration with Pakistan Television’s Tele-school and the Federal Ministry of Education. Workbooks in the form of a print magazine were also published and distributed among primary and secondary students who would otherwise have no access to online learning due to limited broadband penetration and lack of smart devices in less privileged communities. These publications were edited by Salim Mughal, former editor of Hamdard Naunehal.

Allocation of donations 
Being a charitable organisation the sole source of income is donations. They receive nearly 80%  of the funds from Pakistanis at home, which include corporate sponsorship and individuals. The rest of the donations are received from expatriate communities. More than 90% of the funds are utilized in the building and running of schools, providing equipment for libraries and science laboratories, children's uniforms, books and snacks. The remaining are allocated for administration costs.

TCF's accounts are audited by KPMG and available to the public. As of 2018, TCF is assigned a non-profit organization (NPO) governance rating of GR-9+ by JCR-VIS Credit Rating Co Ltd, denoting a high level of governance in TCF.

Treatment of Zakat 
TCF has a Shariah scholar on its advisory board to ensure utilization of zakat funds is as per Shariah standards. Accounting for Zakat funds is separate from donation funds. Zakat is only used in operational support funds which are utilized within a year. We do not use Zakat funds on capital expenditures or endowment funds. To ensure children are deserving of Zakat funds, parents take an undertaking confirming they are eligible for Zakat.

International presence 
TCF is supported by a global network of Chapters

 The Citizens Foundation, USA: a 501(c) (3) tax-exempt organization (recognized by the U.S. Internal Revenue Service) and a 4-star Charity Navigator rating
 The Citizens Foundation (UK): Registered with the UK Charity Commission
 The Citizens Foundation, Canada: Registered by the Canada Revenue Agency (CRA) as a Charity
 TCF Educating Children Australia, Inc: registered with the Australian Charities and Not-for-profits Commission ACNC

Awards and recognition 
TCF has won a number of awards including MAP, and ICAP, South Asian Federation of Accountants (SAFA) for the best presented annual report.

2017 - UNESCO Confucius Prize for Literacy

2016 - Top 10 finalists for the OECD DAC prize

2015 - Schwab's Social Entrepreneur of the Year

2014 - Ramon Magsaysay Award, informally thought to be the “Nobel Prize for Asia”

2013 - Skoll Foundation Award for Social Entrepreneurs

2011 - Clinton Global Initiative

2010 - World Innovation Summit for Education (WISE) Award by the Qatar Foundation

References

External links
The Citizens Foundation Pakistan
The Citizens Foundation Canada
The Citizens Foundation UK
The Citizens Foundation USA
TCF Educating Children Australia, Inc

Non-profit organisations based in Pakistan
Organisations based in Karachi
Educational organisations based in Pakistan
1995 establishments in Pakistan
Organizations established in 1995
Foundations based in Pakistan